The 19th Mieczysław Połukard Criterium of Polish Speedway League Aces was the 2000 version of the Mieczysław Połukard Criterium of Polish Speedway Leagues Aces. It took place on March 26 in the Polonia Stadium in Bydgoszcz, Poland.

Starting positions draw 

  Tomasz Gollob - Polonia Bydgoszcz
  Rafał Dobrucki - Ludwik-Polonia Piła
  Antonín Kasper, Jr. - Start Gniezno
  Brian Andersen - Atlas Wrocław
  Sebastian Ułamek - Lotos-Wybrzeże Gdańsk
  Joe Screen - Polonia Bydgoszcz
  Shane Parker - Polonia Bydgoszcz
  Wiesław Jaguś - Apator-Netia Toruń
  Henrik Gustafsson - Polonia Bydgoszcz
  Michał Robacki - Polonia Bydgoszcz
  Jacek Gollob - Ludwik-Polonia Piła
  Mikael Karlsson - RKM Rybnik
  Stefan Dannö - TŻ Noban Opole
  Piotr Protasiewicz - Polonia Bydgoszcz
  Robert Sawina - Atlas Wrocław
  Brian Karger - Ludwik-Polonia Piła
  (R1) Łukasz Stanisławski - Polonia Bydgoszcz
  (R2) Robert Umiński - Polonia Bydgoszcz

Heat details

Sources 
 Roman Lach - Polish Speedway Almanac

See also 

Criterium of Aces
Mieczysław Połukard Criterium of Polish Speedway Leagues Aces